Gary Paczosa is an audio engineer, producer and A&R rep for Sugar Hill Records. He has been nominated 11 times for the Grammy Award for Best Engineered Album, Non-Classical.

He is best known for working with Alison Krauss and Dolly Parton numerous times. He has more recently worked with Sarah Jarosz and Parker Millsap.

Originally from Colorado, Paczosa now lives in Nashville.

References

External links
Top Engineers On Recording Vocals
Gary Paczosa Says It's About Listening to the Instruments Part 1
Gary Paczosa Says It's About Listening to the Instruments Part 2

Grammy Award winners
Year of birth missing (living people)
Living people
American audio engineers
Record producers from Colorado